This is a list of the National Register of Historic Places listings in Zapata County, Texas.

This is intended to be a complete list of properties and districts listed on the National Register of Historic Places in Zapata County, Texas. There are two districts and four individual properties listed on the National Register in the county. One property is a National Historic Landmark and is part of a historic district. This property is also a Recorded Texas Historic Landmark.

Current listings

The publicly disclosed locations of National Register properties and districts may be seen in a mapping service provided.

|}

See also

National Register of Historic Places listings in Texas
List of National Historic Landmarks in Texas
Recorded Texas Historic Landmarks in Zapata County

References

External links

Zapata County, Texas
Zapata County
Buildings and structures in Zapata County, Texas